gímik is a Japanese animation production group, formed by Keiji Gotoh, Megumi Kadonosono and Hidefumi Kimura.

In the past, animators have often formed production groups to produce animations, but increasingly animation groups are assuming a dominant role in the process, and developing works with their own distinctive style. While there is as yet no collective name for this form of collaboration, the number of such groups is increasing.

Members
Keiji Gotoh
Megumi Kadonosono
Hidefumi Kimura

Works
October 2009 KIDDY GiRL-AND (anime)
September 2005 Gemini Knives (light novel)
October 2004 Uta∽Kata (anime)
October 2002 Kiddy Grade (anime)

Anime companies